X-Pressions is the debut studio album by New York City DJ group The X-Ecutioners. The album was released on September 23, 1997 for Asphodel Records and was produced by four members of The X-Ecutioners, including Rob Swift, Total Eclipse, Roc Raida, and Mista Sinista.

History 
Though the album was not a commercial success, it did gain many positive reviews and today is considered to be somewhat of a classic. "Música Negra (Black Music)/Wordplay" and "Raida's Theme" (as a remix CD single) were released as singles. However, along with the album, they did not chart.

Track listing

Reception

References

External links 
 The X-Ecutioners at Rolling Stone Magazine
 The X-Ecutioners at IGN Music

The X-Ecutioners albums
1997 debut albums
Hip hop albums by American artists